In 1643, near the start of the English Civil War, Parliament set up two committees: the Sequestration Committee which confiscated the estates of the Royalists who fought against Parliament, and the Committee for Compounding with Delinquents which allowed Royalists whose estates had been sequestrated, to compound for their estates – pay a fine and recover their estates – if they pledged not to take up arms against Parliament again. The size of the fine they had to pay depended on the worth of the estate and how great their support for the Royalist cause had been.

To administer the process of sequestration, a sequestration committee was established in each county. If a local committee sequestrated an estate they usually let it to a tenant and the income was used "to the best advantage of the State". If a "delinquent" wished to recover his estate he had to apply to the Committee for Compounding with Delinquents based in London, as the national Sequestration Committee was absorbed by the Committee for Compounding in 1644.

After the Restoration of the monarchy in 1660, most of the sequestrated land was returned to the pre-war owners.

Background
In 1643, the "Parliamentary Committee for the Sequestration of Delinquents' Estates" was formed to confiscate the estates of Royalists who fought against the victorious Parliamentarians in the Civil War.  This was followed by the establishment of the Committee for Compounding for the Estates of Royalists and Delinquents, at Goldsmiths' Hall in the City of London, which first met on 8 November 1643.

In January 1646, the committee announced favourable terms for those who compounded prior to 1 May. This allowed those whose estates had been confiscated to regain them on payment of a fine, based on the value of their lands, and level of support. Many took advantage of this.

Assessment of sum
The delinquent paid a fine proportional to the value of his estate, frequently three times net annual income.

Valuation of estate
The delinquent submitted to the "Committee for Compounding with Delinquents" a signed declaration of his revenue and assets, which ended with wording such as: This is a true particular of the estate he doth desire to compound with this Honourable Committee for, wherein he doth submit himself to the fine to be imposed (partial transcript of declaration to the Committee for Compounding with Delinquents of Francis Choke of Avington, Berkshire, dated
1646).

Payment
Payment of the sum compounded was made generally at Goldsmiths' Hall in the City of London, where the committee was based.

See also
 Committee for the Advance of Money
 Committee for Plundered Ministers
 Drury House Trustees responsible for the sale of Royalist lands.

Notes

References

Further reading
Ergerton Chesney, H (1932). The Transference of lands in England 1640–1660, Transactions of the Royal Historical Society (Fourth Series) (1932), 15: 181–210 Cambridge University Press.
Sequestration Committee: Books and Papers:SP 20, The National Archives. "Sequestration Committee, 1643–1650" (Covering dates 1643–1653)
Committee for Compounding with Delinquents: Books and Papers SP 23, The National Archives, "Committee for Compounding with Delinquents, 1643–1656 and Committee for Scottish Affairs, 1643–1656" (Covering dates 1643–1664)
Search for: creator:"Great Britain. Committee for Compounding with Delinquents (1643–1660)", Internet Archive
 — The papers record the particulars of the estates and personal property sworn on oath to belong to delinquents as part of the compounding process. Records held under SP 28 also contain material concerning the County Committees for Compounding with Delinquents.

External links
 Phillimore, W.P.W., (ed.) Index nominum (index of names) to the Royalist Composition Papers, first and second series, volumes 1 and 2, London, 1889; archive.org

English Civil War
Parliament of England
The National Archives (United Kingdom)
1643 establishments in England